Mary Coleman may refer to:
 Mary Coleman (politician) (born 1946), member of the Mississippi House of Representatives
 Mary Sue Coleman (born 1943), 13th and former President of the University of Michigan
 Mary S. Coleman (1914–2001), justice of the Michigan Supreme Court